The Wubei Zhi (Treatise on Armament Technology or Records of Armaments and Military Provisions), also commonly known by its Japanese translated name Bubishi, is a military book in Chinese history. It was compiled in 1621 by Mao Yuanyi (茅元儀 Máo Yuányí; 1594–1640?), an officer of waterborne troops in the Ming Dynasty. The Wubei Zhi contains 240 volumes, 10,405 pages, and more than 200,000 Chinese characters.

Structure

Wubei Zhi consists of five sections, "Bing Jue Ping", "Zhan Lue Kao", "Zhen Lian Zhi", "Jun Zi Sheng", and "Zhan Du Zai".

"Bing Jue Ping" (Commentary on Military Formulae)
Containing 18 chapters, this section includes military theories from significant figures including but not limited to Sun Tzu. Some of these theories back to the last years of Eastern Zhou Dynasty, more than 1,800 years before the editor.

"Zhan Lue Kao" (Consideration of Tactics)
This section consists of 31 chapters, and describes more than 600 specific examples of battles that took place between the Eastern Zhou Dynasty and the Yuan Dynasty.  Among these are Battle of Maling and Battle of Red Cliffs, the latter of which is a classic example of defeating an overpowering enemy.

"Zhen Lian Zhi" (Record of Formations and Training)
This section of the book contains 41 chapters. It contains different methods of training troops including infantry, cavalry and chariots, as well as individual martial arts training with different weapons such as the spear and Dao.	

 
"Jun Zi Sheng" (Summary of Logistics)
This section is divided into 55 categories, covering a variety of contents related to wartime logistics, such as marching, encampments, troops arrays, transmitting orders, attacking and defending cities, and provision of food, weapons, healthcare and transportation, among others.

"Zhan Du Zai"
In this section, which is 96 chapters long, the author discusses aspects of weather and geographic features that are related to combat, as well as traditional Chinese methods of divination, formation, and finally marine navigation. Included into this section is the so-called "Mao Kun map", the unique surviving map representing the Pacific and Indian Ocean shipping routes used by the fleets of Zheng He.

Impact
Being known as "a military encyclopedia in ancient China", Wubei Zhi is one of the most influential works in Chinese history on warfare.  It is a rare source of many maps and weapon designs, and contributed enormously to its various chapters' corresponding areas. It also provides an account of ancient Chinese military theories and Chinese militarists' thoughts.

Gallery

Melee weapons

Bows and crossbows

Fire arrows and rockets

Hand cannons and fire lances

Matchlock firearms

Cannons

Explosives

Animals

See also
Wujing Zongyao, Chinese military compendium written from around 1040 to 1044.
Huolongjing, mid-14th-century Chinese military treatise.
Jixiao Xinshu, Chinese military manual written during the 1560s and 1580s.

Notes

References

  (reprinted by the White Lotus Press, 1997,)

External links
A discussions of the Okinawan Bubishi (Wubei Zhi) and its significance to karate
The Bible of Karate (Bubishi) PDF on the Internet Archive

Chinese-language books
Books about military history
Encyclopedias of the military
Chinese military texts
Chinese encyclopedias
17th-century encyclopedias
Ming dynasty literature